Bicarbonate is an ion, more accurately referred to as hydrogen carbonate.

Bicarbonate may also refer to:
 Ammonium bicarbonate, the ammonium salt of the bicarbonate ion
 Sodium bicarbonate, the sodium salt of the bicarbonate ion
 Tim Toady Bicarbonate, a Perl programming motto